Birgella is a genus of gastropods belonging to the family Hydrobiidae.

The species of this genus are found in Northern America.

Species:

Birgella burchi 
Birgella subglobosa  (synonym: Birgella subglobosus)

References

Hydrobiidae